Grihapravesha is a Hindu ceremony performed on the occasion of an individual's first time entering their new home. This ceremony is similar in nature to Housewarming party. In Kerala, this ceremony refers to the occasion when a newly wed bride enters her new home with her husband during a pre-ordained Mahuratam (auspicious time).

The "Puja" or act of worship, is performed in various stages during the construction and entry of the home. Once the home is ready, the individual has to find an auspicious time to conduct the puja, in consultation with an astrologer or Hindu priest. Grihapravesha is popular in three forms: 
 "Apoorva", which is performed upon the first entry into a newly constructed home,
 "Sapoorva", which is done when an individual enters the home after arriving from a foreign land, and
 "Dwandwah", which is done when the individual enters the home after reconstruction or renovation, which might be due to fire, flood or earthquake. Among others, various Puja recommended are the Vastu Puja and Vastu Shanti. After the Grihapravesha is performed, one may enter their new house.

Types 
Depending on the house types, there are various types griha pravesh methods used in ancient India. Main in these are apoorva, sapoorva and dwandhav grah pravesh

Dates (2023)

Griha Pravesh Muhurat in January 2023

Griha Pravesh Muhurat in Feb 2023

Griha Pravesh Muhurat in March 2023

Griha Pravesh Muhurat in April 2023 
There are no suitable or favorable dates for a housewarming ceremony in April 2023.

Griha Pravesh Muhurat in May 2023

Griha Pravesh Muhurat in June 2023

Griha Pravesh Muhurat in July, August, September, October 2023 
It is believed to be unlucky to perform Griha Pravesh Puja or any other auspicious ceremonies during the period known as Chaturmas, which runs from July 2nd to November 11th in 2023.

Griha Pravesh Muhurat in November 2023

Griha Pravesh Muhurat in December 2023

References 

Rigvedic deities
Puja types in Hinduism